Thai Rung Union Car is the only Thai-based automobile manufacturer. The  company, established in 1967, began assembling Isuzu, Toyota, Nissan, and Chevrolet vehicles. In addition to assembly, It manufactures its own brand car, under the name Thai Rung (or TR).

Thai Rung exports semi-knocked-down kits (SKD) to China, North Korea, and Iran, with plans for further exports to the Philippines, Egypt, and Kenya.

History
It remains 70% owned by Phaoenchoke family members, with Sompong Phaoenchoke being the CEO of the company.

In 1999, Thai Rung supplied the Chevrolet plant in Arica, Chile with Grand Adventure body parts to make the Chevrolet LUV Wagon and the Grand LUV.

Sales of the Adventure Master, based on the Isuzu D-Max pickup started in 2003 with about 300 units sold per month. At the same time sales of the Xciter, based on the Nissan Frontier D22, were around 100 units per month.

Models

Lineup 
 TR Transformer II (2019)
TR MUV4 (military vehicle for the Royal Thai Army), based on Toyota Hilux Vigo Isuzu D-Max
TR Transformer, based on the Toyota Hilux Vigo
TR Transformer Plus4
TR Transformer Max
TR Transformer II, based on the Toyota Hilux Revo
TR Transformer Max
TR Silly BOY
TR Traveller, First minibus in Thailand based on the  Isuzu NPR/Journey Minibus And  Nissan Diesel Condor (2nd Generation) /Civillan Minibus                                                     •  TR Traveller Max.                                                •  TR Traveller ll

Discontinued 
Isuzu Stationwagon (1979-1983), based on the Isuzu KB
Isuzu KB Stationwagon (1982-1991), based on the Isuzu KB
Isuzu Victor (1986-1997), based on the Isuzu TF
Isuzu Buddy (1982-2002), based on the Isuzu TF and Isuzu WFR
Isuzu Supreme (1992-2002), based on the Isuzu TF
Isuzu Adventure (1993-1997), based on the Isuzu TF
Isuzu Wanderer (1993-1997), based on the Isuzu TF
Isuzu Tripper (1996-2002), based on the Isuzu TF Dragon Eyes / Dragon Power
TR Grand Adventure (1997-2002), based on the Isuzu TF Dragon Eyes / Dragon Power
TR Adventure Master (2002-2012), based on the Isuzu D-MAX
TR Adventure II (2008-2012), based on the Isuzu D-MAX
TR Adventure Sport (2006 - 2012), based on the Isuzu D-MAX (including Isuzu 4JJ1-TC Engine)
TR Adventure Elegance (2006 - 2012), based on the Isuzu D-MAX (including Isuzu 4JJ1-TC Engine)
TR Adventure Sport EX (2006 - 2012), based on the Isuzu D-MAX (including Isuzu 4JJ1-TC Engine)
TR Allroader (2007-2012), based on the Chevrolet Colorado
TR Exclusive Limousine (2009-2012), based on the Isuzu D-MAX and Chevrolet Colorado
TR Xciter (1995-2005), based on the Nissan D22 BIG-M FRONTIER
TR Super Xciter (2002-2008), based on the Nissan D22 (including Nissan TD27 & Nissan ZD30DDT Engine)
TR Freelife (2002-2008), based on the Nissan D22 (including Nissan TD27 & ZD30DD Engine)
TR Superior (1991-1998), based on the Toyota Hilux
TR Vanner (1987-1996) based on the Toyota Hilux Hero and Isuzu WFR
TR Passport (1996-2002) based on the Isuzu TF And Nissan D21
TR Super-Tant (1979-1986) based on the Isuzu Elf (TL) Toyota Dyna (BU35)
Cheetah Truck (1979-1984) based on the Isuzu Elf (TL) and Toyota Dyna (BU35)
Cheetah Minibus (1979-1986) based on the Isuzu Elf (TL) And Toyota Dyna (BU35)

References

External links 
 

Car manufacturers of Thailand
Manufacturing companies based in Bangkok
Vehicle manufacturing companies established in 1967
1967 establishments in Thailand
Companies listed on the Stock Exchange of Thailand
Isuzu
Thai brands